City Centre is a Major Division/Area within the city of St. John's, Antigua and Barbuda.

Demographics 
City Centre has 9 enumeration districts. The major division number for City Centre is 10.

As of 2001 the major division has a living condition index of 13.69.

 10100 Buckley's St. (Harbour) 
 10200 Buckley's St. (Central) 
 10300 Buckley's St. (South) 
 10400 Federation Rd. (North) 
 10500 Cooks Hill Rd
 10600 Federation Rd. (South) 
 10700 Gray Hill West
 10800 Green Bay Extension
 10900 George St. (South)

References 

St. John's, Antigua and Barbuda